NH 109 may refer to:

 National Highway 109 (India)
 New Hampshire Route 109, United States